James Gardiner may refer to:

Politicians
 James Gardiner (Australian politician) (1861–1928), Australian politician
 James Gardiner (British politician) (1860–1924), Scottish farmer and Liberal Party politician
 James Garfield Gardiner (1883–1962), Canadian politician
 James Wilfrid Gardiner (1924–2002), politician in Saskatchewan, Canada
 Jim Gardiner (Family Coalition Party), Ontario political candidate
 Jim Gardiner (Chicago politician), Chicago alderman

Religious figures
 James Gardiner (bishop) (1637–1705), 18th-century bishop of Lincoln
 James Gardiner the Younger (1689–1732), Anglican sub-dean of Lincoln, England, writer and translator

Military figures
 James Gardiner (British Army officer) (1688–1745), Scottish soldier
 James Daniel Gardner (1839–1905), also spelled Gardiner, 19th-century American soldier

Other people
 Jim Gardiner (rower) (1930–2016), American rower at the 1956 Olympics
 James Henry Gardiner (1848–1921), Australian rules football administrator, footballer and public servant
 James Terry Gardiner, American surveyor and engineer
 James McDonald Gardiner, American architect, lay missionary and educator

See also
 James Gardner (disambiguation)